Ankara Etlik City Hospital (Turkish: Ankara Etlik Şehir Hastanesi) is a hospital located in the Etlik neighbourhood of Ankara, Turkey. The groundbreaking ceremony was held on 22 October 2013.

The complex consists of nine buildings: 
 General hospital
 Orthopedic and neurological sciences hospital
 Cardiovascular surgery hospital
 Paediatrics hospital
 Gynecology hospital
 Oncology hospital
 Diagnosis and treatment building
 Physical therapy and rehabilitation hospital
 High security forensic psychiatry hospital

Criticism 
One of the concerns over city hospitals is the closure of other hospitals. Some argue that new shopping malls or more profitable buildings will be built after shutting down the hospitals.
Another concern is the lack of infrastructure, where the complexes will be built. Some argue that the roads are insufficient to carry the traffic of so many people.

See also 
 Ankara City Hospital

References 

Hospitals in Ankara
Hospitals established in 2022
Government-owned hospitals in Turkey
2022 establishments in Turkey
Yenimahalle, Ankara